Victoria Michelle Kaspi  (born June 30, 1967) is a Canadian astrophysicist and a professor at McGill University. Her research primarily concerns neutron stars and pulsars.

Early life and education
Kaspi was born in Austin, Texas, but her family moved to Canada when she was seven years old. She completed her undergraduate studies at McGill in 1989, and went to Princeton University for her graduate studies, completing her PhD in 1993 supervised by Nobel Prize-winning astrophysicist Joseph Taylor

Career and research
After positions at the California Institute of Technology, the Jet Propulsion Laboratory, and the Massachusetts Institute of Technology, she took a faculty position at McGill in 1999. At McGill, she held one of McGill's first Canada Research Chairs, and in 2006 she was named the Lorne Trottier Professor of Astrophysics. She is also a Fellow in the Canadian Institute for Advanced Research.

Kaspi's observations of the pulsar associated with supernova remnant G11.2–0.3 in the constellation Sagittarius, using the Chandra X-ray Observatory, showed that the pulsar was at the precise center of the supernova, which had been observed in 386 CE by the Chinese. This pulsar was only the second known pulsar to be associated with a supernova remnant, the first being the one in the Crab Nebula, and her studies greatly strengthened the conjectured relationship between pulsars and supernovae. Additionally, this observation cast into doubt previous methods of dating pulsars by their spin rate; these methods gave the pulsar an age that was 12 times too high to match the supernova.

Kaspi's research with the Rossi X-ray Timing Explorer showed that soft gamma repeaters, astronomical sources of irregular gamma ray bursts, and anomalous X-ray pulsars, slowly rotating pulsars with high magnetic fields, could both be explained as magnetars.

She also helped discover the pulsar with the fastest known rotation rate, PSR J1748-2446ad, star clusters with a high concentration of pulsars, and (using the Green Bank Telescope) the "cosmic recycling" of a slow-spinning pulsar into a much faster millisecond pulsar.

Awards and honours

 1989: Anne Molson Gold Medal in Mathematics and Natural Philosophy, McGill University
1998: Annie J. Cannon Award in Astronomy of the American Astronomical Society
 2004: Herzberg Medal of the Canadian Association of Physicists 
 2006: Steacie Prize 
 2007: Rutherford Memorial Medal of the Royal Society of Canada
 2009: Prix Marie-Victorin, the highest scientific award of the province of Québec  
 2010: Elected a Fellow of the Royal Society (FRS). 
2010: Elected a member of the  National Academy of Sciences of the United States
 2010: Natural Sciences and Engineering Research Council (NSERC) John C. Polanyi Award 
2013: Peter G. Martin Award of Canadian Astronomical Society
2013: Queen Elizabeth II Diamond Jubilee Medal
2014: Elected a Fellow of American Physical Society
2015: Elected member American Academy of Arts & Sciences
2015: Izaak Walton Killam Memorial Prize
 2016: Gerhard Herzberg Canada Gold Medal for Science and Engineering, the first woman to receive this prize.
 2016: Companion of the Order of Canada, Canada's second highest civilian honour.
2017: Fonds de recherche du Québec, Prix d’excellence 
 2019: Kaspi was recognized by Nature as one Nature's 10 for her work on discovering Fast Radio Bursts with the CHIME telescope.
 2021: Bakerian Medal of the Royal Society
 2021: Shaw Prize

Personal life
Kaspi is Jewish. Her husband, David Langleben, is a cardiologist at McGill and at the Sir Mortimer B. Davis Jewish General Hospital in Montreal.

References

1967 births
Living people
Canadian astrophysicists
Canada Research Chairs
Jewish astronomers
Jewish Canadian scientists
Companions of the Order of Canada
Female Fellows of the Royal Society
Fellows of the Royal Society of Canada
McGill University alumni
Academic staff of McGill University
Princeton University alumni
Recipients of the Annie J. Cannon Award in Astronomy
20th-century Canadian astronomers
20th-century Canadian women scientists
21st-century Canadian astronomers
21st-century Canadian women scientists
Canadian Fellows of the Royal Society
Fellows of the American Physical Society
Canadian women physicists